C'est si bon is an album by Arielle Dombasle released in 2006 by Columbia Records.

Tracks 

 "C'est Magnifique" (Cole Porter, François Llenas) – 3:03
 "C'est si bon" (André Hornez, Jerry Seelen, Henri Betti) – 2:52
 "Tico Tico" (Zequinha de Abreu) – 2:13
 "Relax-ay-voo" (Sammy Cahn, Arthur Schwartz) –2:54
 "Dream A Little Dream Of Me" (Gus Kahn, Fabian Andre, Wilbur Schwandt) – 2:45
 "Cheek to Cheek" (Irving Berlin) – 2:24
 "Que Sera, Sera" (Ray Evans, Jay Livingston) – 2:22
 "A Fine Romance" (Dorothy Fields, Jerome Kern) – 2:55
 "Moi, je m'ennuie" (Camille François, Wal-Berg) – 3:44
 "Paris in Delight" (Arielle Dombasle, Jean-Pascal Beintus) – 2:47
 "South American Way" (Al Dubin, Jimmy McHugh) – 2:17
 "The Boys in the Back Room" (Frank Loesser, Friedrich Hollander) – 2:16
 "Darling, Je Vous Aime Beaucoup" (Anna Sosenko) – 2:51
 "Tenias Que Ser Tu" (Gus Kahn, Arielle Dombasle, Isham Jones) – 2:38
 "I'm in the Mood for Love" (Dorothy Fields, Jimmy McHugh) – 2:50

References

Arielle Dombasle albums
Covers albums
2006 albums
French-language albums